José Muro y López-Salgado (21 December 1840, in Valladolid, Spain - 19 June 1907, in Madrid, Spain) was a Spanish politician and lawyer who served as Minister of State in 1873, during the presidency of Francisco Pi y Margall in the First Spanish Republic.

References
www.xtec.es José Muro y López Salgado

|-
 

1840 births
1907 deaths
People from Valladolid
Spanish republicans
Foreign ministers of Spain
Government ministers during the First Spanish Republic